Taiobeiras is a municipality in the north of the state of Minas Gerais in Brazil.  As of 2020 the population was 34,397 in an area of 1,194 km2.  The elevation of the municipal seat is 821 meters.  It became a municipality in 1953.  The postal code (CEP) is  39550-000 and it belongs to the statistical microregion of Salinas

Taiobeiras is located 44 km. north of Salinas on highway MG-404.  It is 704 km. to the state capital, Belo Horizonte.
Neighboring municipalities are:
West: Rio Pardo de Minas,
North: Indaiabira and São João do Paraíso
East: Berizal and Curral de Dentro,
South: Santa Cruz de Salinas and Salinas

The economy is based on agriculture with some cattle raising. There were 18,000 head in 2006. The main agricultural crops were coffee, bananas, citrus fruits, mangoes, tomatoes, and corn. The GDP was R$100,657,000 in 2005. In 2006, there were 1,221 rural establishments employing 1,200 salaried workers. The total agricultural land area was 90,819 hectares. There were 2 banking agencies in the urban area.

This municipality is isolated from major population centers and suffers from drought and poor soils.
Municipal Human Development Index: .700 (2000)
State ranking: 544 out of 853 municipalities as of 2000
National ranking: 2,998 out of 5,138 municipalities as of 2000 
Health clinics and hospitals: 2 basic clinics, 8 health centers, and 1 hospital with 65 beds 
 
The social and health indicators were: degree of urbanization—79.7%; Illiteracy rate: 26.8%; coverage of sewage system in the urban area—0.60%; coverage of garbage collection in the urban area—85.4; and infant mortality—19.60.

See also
List of municipalities in Minas Gerais

References

External links
Prefeitura Municipal de Taiobeiras

Municipalities in Minas Gerais